Gelibolu District is a district of the Çanakkale Province of Turkey. Its seat is the town of Gelibolu. Its area is 823 km2, and its population is 44,598 (2021).

Composition
There are three municipalities in Gelibolu District:
 Evreşe
 Gelibolu
 Kavakköy

There are 26 villages in Gelibolu District:

 Adilhan
 Bayırköy
 Bayramiç
 Bolayır
 Burhanlı
 Cevizli
 Çokal
 Cumalı
 Değirmendüzü
 Demirtepe
 Fındıklı
 Güneyli
 Ilgardere
 Kalealtı
 Karainebeyli
 Kavaklı
 Kocaçeşme
 Koruköy
 Ocaklı
 Pazarlı
 Şadıllı
 Süleymaniye
 Sütlüce
 Tayfurköy
 Yeniköy
 Yülüce

References

Districts of Çanakkale Province